Business Information Review is a quarterly peer-reviewed academic journal that publishes articles on information and knowledge management in organizations. The journal publishes both practitioner and academic papers themed around commercial information management issues. The journal's editors-in-chief are Claire Laybats and Luke Tredinnick. It has been in publication since 1984 and is currently published by SAGE Publications.

Business Information Review is notable for producing the Annual Survey of Business Information, which has been published annually since 1991.

Abstracting and indexing 
Business Information Quarterly is abstracted and indexed in:
 ABI/INFORM
 Corporate ResourceNET
 Current Contents/Social and Behavioral Sciences
 Inspec
 Library and Information Science Abstracts
 Scopus

External links 
 

SAGE Publishing academic journals
English-language journals
Knowledge management journals
Quarterly journals
Publications established in 1984